The Hohe Egge, at a good , is the highest point on the Süntel ridge in the Calenberg Uplands in the German federal state of Lower Saxony. On its summit is the Süntel Tower.

The Hohe Egge or Süntel, with its topographic prominence of 300 metres, is one of the most prominent hills and ridges in North Germany.

References 

Hills of Lower Saxony
Hameln-Pyrmont
Weser Uplands